Scott Teems is an American film director, screenwriter, and producer best known for his work on That Evening Sun (2009), The Quarry (2020), Halloween Kills (2021), and Firestarter (2022).

Career
In 2009, Teems started his career by directing and writing the drama film That Evening Sun. In February 2012, Teems signed on to script a film version of Cutting for Stone. In October 2012, he was attached to script Scott Derrickson's horror film The Breathing Method, based on Stephen King's novella of the same name. In 2014, he wrote and directed the documentary film Holbrook/Twain: An American Odyssey. By 2016, he scripted six episodes for the drama series Rectify, directing two of them.

In November 2018, he drafted the script for an episode of Narcos: Mexico. In 2020, he directed the mystery thriller film The Quarry, from a screenplay he wrote alongside Andrew Brotzman. He wrote the script and story for horror sequel Halloween Kills (2021), and also scripted the horror-thriller remake Firestarter, released in 2022.

In July 2019, Teems was announced to have drafted the story for David Gordon Green's upcoming The Exorcist revival. In October 2020, he was brought on board to script the upcoming Insidious: Fear the Dark.

Filmography 
Film

Television

Accolades
For That Evening Sun, he won awards at the 2006 IFP Market Award for "Emerging Narrative Screenplay Award", the 2009 Atlanta Film Festival for "Jury Award for Best Narrative", the 2009 Newport International Film Festival for "Special Narrative Feature Jury Prize" and "Student Jury Narrative Grand Prize", and the 2009 Sidewalk Moving Picture Festival for "Best Director".

References

External links
 

21st-century American male writers
21st-century American screenwriters
American film directors
American male screenwriters
Living people
Place of birth missing (living people)
Year of birth missing (living people)